Standing Hampton is the sixth studio album by American rock vocalist Sammy Hagar, released on January 6, 1982 by Geffen. This is his first album after moving from Capitol Records to Geffen. It was his first album to achieve RIAA certification, eventually going platinum, and five of its singles charted in either the mainstream rock or pop singles charts.

The British version of the album was released with a bonus interview 45 rpm called Conversations with Sammy Hagar (Geffen XPS 133).

Critical reception
Kerrang! reviewer Dante Bonutto praised the album opener "There's Only One Way to Rock" (in British editions it was a first track) and complained that the rest of the songs on the album could not match its energy and originality.

Title and artwork
Hagar has said that he was originally going to call this album One Way To Rock. It was a British fan who told him of the term that came to be the title. In Cockney rhyming slang, a "Hampton" is a substitution for penis (Hampton Wick rhymes with "Dick"). One that is "standing" would be a reference to an erection. This led to the cover art that shows a gentleman greeting a woman in various states of undress. The liner notes on the inner sleeve state that the cover graphics were inspired by the work of Surrealist painter Paul Delvaux.

Song information
"I'll Fall in Love Again" was used in the soundtrack to the film Vision Quest.
A couple of non-album tracks, "Don't Get Hooked" and "Satisfied", appeared as B-sides and have not been released in any other format since.
"There's Only One Way to Rock" went on to be one of Hagar's biggest solo hits and a signature tune. This song, along with "I Can't Drive 55", were the two Hagar songs that Van Halen consistently played when he joined the band.
A different version of the song "Heavy Metal" was used for the soundtrack for the animated movie Heavy Metal.
The lyrics to the song "Inside Lookin' In" refers to "ringin' just like one UXB". UXB is an acronym for an "unexploded bomb".
The lyrics to "Sweet Hitchhiker" refers to "Blaupunkt blastin' my favorite song". Blaupunkt refers to a popular brand of car stereo.
"Piece of My Heart" is a cover of the song originally recorded by Erma Franklin and made famous by Janis Joplin.

Track listing
All songs written by Sammy Hagar, except where noted.

Charts

Weekly charts

Year-end charts

Charting Singles

Certifications

|-

Personnel

Musicians
Sammy Hagar – lead vocals, guitar
Gary Pihl – guitar, backing vocals
Bill Church – bass guitar, backing vocals
David Lauser – drums, backing vocals

Production
Keith Olsen – producer, engineer
Chris Minto – engineer
Greg Fulginiti – mastering
Richard Seireeni – art direction

Releases
Geffen Records (Japan): 25AP 2247
Geffen Records (Japan): MVCG 21004
Geffen Records (UK): GEF 85456
Geffen Records (Holland): GEF 45456
Geffen Records (Germany): GEFD 02006

References

External links
Lyrics from Sammy's official site link

Sammy Hagar albums
1982 albums
Albums produced by Keith Olsen
Geffen Records albums